Mount Bosworth is located in the Canadian Rockies on the border of Alberta and British Columbia. The mountain is situated immediately northwest of Kicking Horse Pass and straddles the shared border of Banff National Park with Yoho National Park. It was named in 1903 after George Morris Bosworth, an executive and long-time employee of the Canadian Pacific Railway.

Geology

Mount Bosworth is composed of sedimentary rock laid down during the Precambrian to Jurassic periods. Formed in shallow seas, this sedimentary rock was pushed east and over the top of younger rock during the Laramide orogeny.

Climate

Based on the Köppen climate classification, Mount Bosworth is located in a subarctic climate with cold, snowy winters, and mild summers.

See also
List of peaks on the Alberta–British Columbia border
List of mountains of Alberta
Mountains of British Columbia

References

Two-thousanders of Alberta
Two-thousanders of British Columbia
Mountains of Banff National Park
Mountains of Yoho National Park